Igor Gräzin (born 27 June 1952 in Tartu) is an Estonian politician, long-time member of Riigikogu and former Member of the European Parliament. He was a member of the Reform Party until 2019, and joined the Centre Party in 2022. An Eurosceptic, he was a dissenting voice in the strongly pro-EU Reform Party. He was the only member of Riigikogu to vote against ratifying the Treaty establishing a Constitution for Europe.

In addition to his political activities, Gräzin is a senior partner of the Tartu-based law firm Bachman and Partners and lectures in Tallinn School of Economics. Acted as defense attorney in renowned "Hiiu air-crash case" (2004-2011) with K. Bachmann.

Till 1989, a professor of law at the Tartu State University, then elected to the Supreme Soviet of the Soviet Union (was a candidate of the Popular Front of Estonia). After the dissolution of the Soviet Union he taught at the University of Notre Dame in the United States till 2000, after that at the University Nord in Tallinn (as the Dean of the Law School and the Vice President). Served as research fellow at the Woodrow Wilson Center in Washington D.C. Written academic papers on philosophy of law, theory of legal interpretation, macroeconomics. Latest research: in area of legal semiotics and structural semiotics of visual arts. Written essays legal mythology (especially - on Franz Kafka), political philosophy, political psychiatry ("Politics as Depression and Suicidal Mania").

"Gräzin initiative" is his proposal to restore the withdrawn Estonian Maritime border in its post-war configuration (as it stood till 1993) and thus gain to Estonia influence within the Nord Stream 1 project (gas pipeline between Russia and Germany routed through the Gulf of Finland). Politically: strong proponent of unified and integrated energy policy in European Union.

Gräzin cooperates with the Russian author Viktor Suvorov.

Co-anchor of a weekly political TV-show, freelance political columnist. 1991-2002 he was a member of the Republican Party of the US (he was a lecturer in the US at times). He is functionally trilingual in Estonian, English, and Russian.

References

1952 births
Living people
Members of the Riigikogu, 1995–1999
Members of the Riigikogu, 2003–2007
Members of the Riigikogu, 2007–2011
Members of the Riigikogu, 2011–2015
Members of the Riigikogu, 2015–2019
Estonian Reform Party politicians
Politicians from Tartu
Miina Härma Gymnasium alumni
University of Tartu alumni
University of Notre Dame faculty
Academic staff of the University of Tartu
20th-century Estonian politicians
21st-century Estonian politicians
MEPs for Estonia 2014–2019